The 2018–19 Ukrainian First League is the 28th since its establishment. The competition began on 21 July 2018 with the match between Prykarpattia Ivano-Frankivsk and Balkany Zorya. The competition was in recess for a winter break which started after the completion of Round 18 on 18 November 2018. The competition resumed on 24 March 2019 and expected to end 25 May 2019.

Format
The format of the league was approved at the PFL Conference on 27 June 2018. In some aspects it was similar to previous, but it was adopted in two versions in case if there will be decision to expand the Ukrainian Premier League back to 16 clubs for 2019–20 season.

As in the previous season the season winner will earn direct promotion to the top division, while two runners-up (2nd and 3rd places) will contest additional promotion berths through play-off games with weaker club of the UPL (10th and 11th places). At the same time in case of the UPL possible expansion the first four teams will earn promotion with the fifth team qualifying for play-off games with the UPL wooden spoon team. In regards to relegation it was decided that the last three teams will be relegated to the Second League, but in case of the UPL possible expansion only two teams will be relegated.

In mid-July 2018, due to withdrawal of FC Naftovyk-Ukrnafta Okhtyrka and FC Stal Kamianske (FC Feniks Bucha), the PFL adopted 16 teams league format. 

On 15 November 2018, in interview to Sport Arena the president of the PFL Ukraine Serhiy Makarov stated that teams that will place 16th and 15th places will be replaced with both winners of Druha Liha groups winners, while 13th and 14th place will contest their relegation with Druha Liha groups runners-up. If there will be an expansion of the UPL to 16 teams, the exchange between Persha and Druha leagues changes as well. The first and second places in each groups of Druha Liha will be promoted, while third places will play-off the other two promotional berths with the 15th and the 16th places of Persha Liha. The president pointed that with withdrawal of Kobra (Helios) and with expansion of the UPL, one of the third placed clubs in Druha Liha will be promoted to Persha Liha without play-offs.

Teams

Promoted teams 
The following teams have been promoted from the 2017–18 Ukrainian Second League:
 Ahrobiznes Volochysk – first place of the 2017–18 Ukrainian Second League Group A (debut)
 Prykarpattia Ivano-Frankivsk – second place of the 2017–18 Ukrainian Second League Group A (debut, another club named as Prykarpattia Ivano-Frankivsk competed in the 2010–11 season)
 SC Dnipro-1 – first place of the 2017–18 Ukrainian Second League Group B (debut)
 Metalist 1925 Kharkiv – second place of the 2017–18 Ukrainian Second League Group B (debut, however another club named as Metalist Kharkiv competed in the 2003–04 season)

Relegated teams 
The following teams have been relegated from the 2017–18 Ukrainian Premier League:
 Zirka Kropyvnytskyi – 10th place of the 2017–18 Ukrainian Premier League, play-off defeat (returns after 2 seasons)
 Chornomorets Odesa, 11th place of the 2017–18 Ukrainian Premier League, was originally relegated after the relegation play-off defeat, however due to the withdrawal of newly promoted FC Poltava from the Ukrainian Premier League, the club remains in 2018–19 Ukrainian Premier League to replace FC Poltava.

Withdrawn teams 
 Stal Kamianske, 12th place of the 2017–18 Ukrainian Premier League, was originally relegated, but later withdraw from the First League. The same day the PFL president confirmed that the league will consist of 16 teams. Originally, FC Stal Kamianske that were located in Kamianske played its games of the 2017–18 Ukrainian Premier League season in Kyiv. After relegation the club was admitted to the First League representing Bucha, Kyiv Oblast. Prior to the season commencing the club was renamed to FC Feniks Bucha.
 Naftovyk-Ukrnafta Okhtyrka, the Professional Football League allowed the club to keep its berth in the second tier even after its main sponsor announced that it will discontinue to fund the club. 
 Helios Kharkiv, the club reorganized under new management under a new name as FC Kobra Kharkiv. The club merged with another amateur club called the Kobra Football Academy which was playing in the Kharkiv Oblast Football Championship. On 15 August 2018 the club informed the Professional Football League of Ukraine about withdrawal from professional competitions, and were later officially expelled from the league.
 Zirka Kropyvnytskyi, the club withdrew as its management and owners were involved in corruption scandal.

Location map 
The following displays the location of teams.

Stadiums 

The following stadiums are considered home grounds for the teams in the competition.

Managers

Managerial changes

League table

Position by round

Results

Post season play-offs

Promotion play-offs

Relegation play-offs
The drawing for relegation playoff took place on 20 May 2019.

First leg

Second leg

Ahrobiznes Volochysk won 4–1 on aggregate and has preserved its berth for the 2019–20 Ukrainian First League. Metalurh Zaporizhia has kept its berth for the 2019–20 Ukrainian Second League, but later gained promotion due to withdrawal of Arsenal-Kyiv from professional ranks.

Cherkashchyna-Akademiya won 7–1 on aggregate and was promoted to the 2019–20 Ukrainian First League. PFC Sumy was relegated to the 2019–20 Ukrainian Second League. Later following the PFL Conference PFC Sumy were excluded from professional competitions.

Top goalscorers 

Notes:

Awards

Monthly awards

Round awards

See also 
 2018–19 Ukrainian Premier League
 2018–19 Ukrainian Second League
 2018–19 Ukrainian Cup

References 

Ukrainian First League seasons
2018–19 in Ukrainian association football leagues
Ukraine